General elections were held in Monaco on 24 March 1968. The result was a victory for the National and Democratic Union, which won all 18 seats in the National Council.

Results

By party

References

Elections in Monaco
Monaco
1968 in Monaco
March 1968 events in Europe